Chris Dekker (born 6 December 1945 in Westzaan, North Holland) is a retired football defender and midfielder from the Netherlands.

Playing career

Club
He played in AZ'67's first ever squad after the merger between his club FC Zaanstreek and Alkmaar '54 and also played for NEC, DWS and FC Amsterdam, before moving to Belgium to play for Charleroi (1977–1981). When he returned to Holland in 1981 he signed for Sparta Rotterdam and ended his career at Fortuna Sittard (1982–1985). He also played for Seiko Sports Association in Hong Kong in the early 80s.

International
He earned one cap for the Netherlands national football team, when he replaced Johan Neeskens on 27 March 1974 in a friendly against Austria.

Managerial career
Dekker played his last match on 10 March 1985, and became a football manager, who coached Fortuna Sittard, FC Eindhoven, United Arab Emirates outfit Al-Jazira, FC Den Bosch, Qatar U-17, RBC, Sparta Rotterdam and Fortuna Sittard once again. He also was Academy boss at Feyenoord.

His most recent job was coach at his former youth club KFC.

See also
Sparta Rotterdam season 2002–03

References

External links
 
  

1945 births
Living people
Sportspeople from Zaanstad
Association football utility players
Association football defenders
Dutch footballers
Netherlands international footballers
Dutch football managers
Association football midfielders
AZ Alkmaar players
NEC Nijmegen players
AFC DWS players
FC Amsterdam players
MVV Maastricht players
R. Charleroi S.C. players
Sparta Rotterdam players
Fortuna Sittard players
Eredivisie players
Eerste Divisie players
Belgian Pro League players
Dutch expatriate footballers
Expatriate footballers in Belgium
Dutch expatriate sportspeople in Belgium
FC Eindhoven managers
Fortuna Sittard managers
Al Jazira Club managers
FC Den Bosch managers
Feyenoord non-playing staff
RBC Roosendaal managers
Sparta Rotterdam managers
Dutch expatriate football managers
Expatriate football managers in the United Arab Emirates
Dutch expatriate sportspeople in the United Arab Emirates
Expatriate football managers in Qatar
Dutch expatriate sportspeople in Qatar
20th-century Dutch people
21st-century Dutch people